Macarthur Football Club, an association football club based in South Western Sydney, Sydney, was founded in 2017 as Macarthur South West United. They were one of the two expansion clubs admitted into the A-League Men in 2020, having played one friendly match in the 2018–19 season. The club's name changed to Macarthur FC when their crest and colours were announced as club. The club's first team has competed in the A-League Men, and all players who have played at least one such match are listed below.

Lachlan Rose holds the record for the greatest number of appearances for Macarthur FC. Between 2020 and 2022 the Australian midfielder played 64 times for the club. The club's goalscoring record is held by Matt Derbyshire, who scored 14 goals in all competitions between 2020 and 2021.

Key
 The list is ordered first by date of debut, and then if necessary in alphabetical order.
 Appearances as a substitute are included.
 Statistics are correct up to and including the match played on 28 January 2023. Where a player left the club permanently after this date, his statistics are updated to his date of leaving.

Players

Players highlighted in bold are still actively playing at Macarthur FC.

Captains
Two players have captained Macarthur FC since it was founded as Macarthur South West United in 2017, first being Mark Milligan, who captained the team until he retired in 2021. The club's longest-serving captain is Mark Milligan, who captained the club for one year between 2020–2021. The current captain is Ulises Dávila, who took over from Mark Milligan in 2021.

References
General
 
 

Specific

Macarthur FC
Soccer clubs in Sydney